Norheim may refer to:

Places
Norheim, a municipality in the Bad Kreuznach district in Rhineland-Palatinate, Germany
Norheim, Rogaland, a village in the municipality of Karmøy in Rogaland county, Norway
Norheim Church, a church in the municipality of Karmøy in Rogaland county, Norway
Nordheim, Vestland, also spelled Norheim, a hamlet in the municipality of Voss in Vestland county, Norway

People
John Olav Norheim (born 1995), a Norwegian football defender who plays for Nest-Sotra 
Kristian Norheim (born 1976), a Norwegian politician from the Progress Party 
Sondre Norheim (1825–1897), was a Norwegian skier and pioneer of modern skiing

See also
Nordheim (disambiguation)